Crollius is a genus of shield bugs in the tribe Podopini.

References

Pentatomidae genera